Pristimantis trepidotus is a species of frog in the family Strabomantidae.
It is endemic to Ecuador.
Its natural habitats are tropical moist montane forest, high-altitude shrubland, and high-altitude grassland.
It is threatened by habitat loss.

References

trepidotus
Endemic fauna of Ecuador
Amphibians of Ecuador
Amphibians of the Andes
Taxa named by Mario Giacinto Peracca
Amphibians described in 1904
Taxonomy articles created by Polbot